Jennyella is a genus of orchids. The description was published in 1999 by E. Luckel & H. Fessel separating  four species previously grouped in Houlletia. The genus is named in honor of Rudolf Jenny, noted researcher and author on orchids.

However, this new genus is not yet accepted by the authoritative database " World Checklist of Monocotylendons" of the Royal Botanical Gardens, Kew. On the other hand, these name were duly publicized in the  Orchid Research Newsletter Issue 36 (July 2000), equally by the Royal Botanical Gardens, Kew.

Distribution is similar to that of Houlletia. Large-growing epiphytic orchids with only a few species known from Mexico (or possibly Guatemala through Central America to Bolivia. They are found growing epiphytically and terrestrially on embankments in cool, humid, wet areas, 1,000-2,200 m elevation.

Flower structure for this genus can be described as globose, nonresupinate flowers that are white to yellow, mostly unspotted, and borne on an erect inflorescence. The epichile is rectangular or ovate (not triangular as in Houelltia), and the lateral projections on the hypochile are broad instead of acute. The pollinarium has a broad, concave viscidium.

The plants have ovoid, ridged pseudobulbs, each bearing 2-4 large, pleated leaves. The inflorescences begin from the base of the pseudobulbs and are always pendant, with fleshy, showy flowers hanging downward ("nodding") on a simple raceme. The dorsal sepal is free and the lateral sepals form a short mentum with the column foot. The petals are similar to the dorsal sepal but smaller. The lip is deeply 3-lobed, the lateral lobes are upcurved and the mid-lobe is spreading. The anther is imperfectly two-celled and there are two waxy pollinia, cleft, with viscidium and a prominent stipe.

For relatives of Jennyella see Stanhopeinae.

Species

Jennyella clarae (previously Houlletia clarae, Schlechter 1924)
Jennyella kalbreyeriana (previously Houlletia kalbreyeriana, Kraenzlin 1920)
Jennyella lowiana (previously Houlletia lowiana, Rchb. f.)
Jennyella sanderi (previously Houlletia sanderi, Rolfe 1910)
Jennyella wallisii (previously Houlletia wallisii, Linden & Rchb. f. 1869)

Hybrids 
None known?

Intergeneric hybrids 
None known?

References

External links 
 Photo of Jennyella sanderi on The Internet Orchid Species Photo Encyclopedia - listed here as Houlletia sanderi.

Stanhopeinae genera
Stanhopeinae
Epiphytic orchids

es:Houlletia